Progarnia is a genus of parasitic alveolates belonging to the phylum Apicomplexia.

History

The genus was described in 1995 by Lainson.

Description

Merogony occurs principally in leucocytes and thrombocytes and to a lesser extent in the erythrocytes. No pigment is produced.

Gametogony, like merogony, occurs principally in leucocytes and thrombocytes and to a lesser extent in the erythrocytes. Again no pigment is produced.

Nothing is currently known about parasitic forms outside the blood.

Hosts

The only known host is the spectacled caiman (Caiman crocodilus crocodilus).

Geographic distribution

This genus has been described in South America.

References

Apicomplexa genera
Haemosporida
Parasites of reptiles